Lillpite IF is a Swedish football club located in Lillpite.

Background
Lillpite IF currently plays in Division 4 Norrbotten Södra which is the sixth tier of Swedish football. They play their home matches at the Brovalla IP in Lillpite.

The club is affiliated to Norrbottens Fotbollförbund.

Season to season

In their most successful period Lillpite IF competed in the following divisions:

In recent seasons Lillpite IF have competed in the following divisions:

Footnotes

External links
 Lillpite IF – Official website
 Lillpite Fotboll on Facebook

Sport in Norrbotten County
Football clubs in Norrbotten County